Said Al Nasr (alt. Said al-Nasser; Nassar Saeed) was a Syrian Palestinian known for carrying out the 28 July 1980 Antwerp summer camp attack, in which he attacked a group of 40 Jewish children waiting with their families for a bus to take them to summer camp with hand grenades. One boy was killed, and eight others were seriously wounded.

Background
Al Nasr was born in 1955. He was convicted in Belgium in 1980, for throwing two hand grenades into a group of Jewish children waiting for a bus in Antwerp on July 27, 1980. He was carrying a Moroccan passport at the time of his arrest.

In the Silco incident, the Belgian government "traded" the jailed Said Al Nasr for members of the family Houtekins-Kets in 1990, a Belgian-French family kidnapped in Libya — a demand of the Abu Nidal militant group.

References

1955 births
Living people
Terrorism in Belgium
Abu Nidal attacks
Islam and antisemitism
Palestinian terrorist incidents in Europe
Palestinian people imprisoned abroad
Prisoners and detainees of Belgium
Terrorist incidents in Belgium in 1980
Palestinian people convicted of murder
Murderers of children
1980 murders in Europe
20th-century attacks on synagogues and Jewish communal organizations
Antwerp Bombing
Jewish Belgian history
Antisemitism in Belgium
Jews and Judaism in Antwerp